Taking Sides may refer to:
 Taking Sides, a novel by Gary Soto
 Taking Sides (film), a 2001 adaptation of Ronald Harwood's play, directed by István Szabó
 Taking Sides (play), a 1995 play by Ronald Harwood
 Taking Sides: Clashing Views in Crime and Criminology, a college-level textbook